"Black Sabbath" is a song by the English heavy metal band Black Sabbath, written in 1969 and released on their self-titled debut album. In 1970, the song appeared as an A-side on a four-track 12-inch single, with "The Wizard" also on the A-side and "Evil Woman" and "Sleeping Village" on the B-side, on the Philips Records label Vertigo. In Japan and the Philippines, a 7-inch single on the Philips label was released with "Evil Woman, Don't Play Your Games with Me" on the A-side and "Black Sabbath" on the B-side.

History
According to the band, the song was inspired by an experience that Geezer Butler had in the days of Earth. Butler, obsessed with the occult at the time, painted his apartment matte black and placed several inverted crucifixes and pictures of Satan on the walls. Ozzy Osbourne gave Butler a black occult book, written in Latin and decorated with numerous pictures of Satan. Butler read the book and then placed it on a shelf beside his bed before going to sleep. When he woke up, he claims he saw a large black figure standing at the end of his bed, staring at him. The figure vanished and Butler ran to the shelf where he had placed the book earlier, but the book was gone. Butler related this story to Osbourne, who then wrote the lyrics to the song based on Butler's experience. The song starts with the lyrics:

A version of this song from Black Sabbath's first demo exists on the Ozzy Osbourne compilation album The Ozzman Cometh. The song has an extra verse with additional vocals before the bridge. The guitar and bass are tuned down one whole step, resulting in the key position of A being played on the fretboard, but having the pitch as G (octave - D flat) to the listener.  It's one of the band's most frequently performed tracks, being featured on every single tour of their career.

Harmony 
AllMusic's Steve Huey said the song is an example wherein Black Sabbath extracted the blue note from the standard pentatonic blues scale and developed a heavy metal riff. The main riff is an inversion of a tritone, constructed with a harmonic progression including a diminished fifth / augmented fourth. This particular interval is often known as diabolus in musica, for it has musical qualities which are often used to suggest Satanic connotations in Western music. The song "Black Sabbath" was one of the earliest examples in heavy metal to make use of this interval, and since then, the genre has made extensive use of diabolus in musica.

The riff was created when bassist Geezer Butler began playing a fragment of "Mars" from Gustav Holst's The Planets suite. Inspired, guitarist Tony Iommi returned the next day with the famously dark tritone.

The main riff of "Black Sabbath" is one of the most famous examples of harmonic progressions with the tritone G-C:

Reception
"Black Sabbath" was ranked the second-best Black Sabbath song by Rock - Das Gesamtwerk der größten Rock-Acts im Check. It was ranked the best song in Black Sabbath's Ozzy Osbourne-era discography by Loudwire. In 2020, Kerrang! ranked the song number one on their list of the 20 greatest Black Sabbath songs, and in 2021, Louder Sound ranked the song number three on their list of the 40 greatest Black Sabbath songs. In March 2023, "Black Sabbath" placed first on Rolling Stone's "100 Greatest Heavy Metal Songs of All Time" list.

"Black Sabbath" was the final song played by Boston rock radio station WAAF on 22 February 2020, its final day of broadcasting. According to longtime WAAF host Mistress Carrie, the song was chosen because "the album came out weeks before we signed on the air, and Ozzy released a new album the day we signed off, and is the only artist to stay current for all 50 years of our history, and well... SATAN. If EMF was going to take our beloved signal, they were going to have to endure Satan first."

Music video
A music video was made for the song, as part of the band's 1970 performance on the German show Beat-Club. The video was filmed in a studio with a village on the foreground.

Cover versions 
"Black Sabbath" has been covered by the following bands:
Flower Travellin' Band in 1970, on their album Anywhere.
Type O Negative in 1994, for the Black Sabbath tribute album Nativity in Black.
Vader in 1994, on their albums Sothis and Future of the Past.
Amber Asylum in 2000, on their album The Supernatural Parlour Collection.
Iced Earth in 2002, on their album Tribute to the Gods.
Van Helsing's Curse in 2004, on their album Oculus Infernum.
Gonga in 2014, with trip hop musician Beth Gibbons (under the track name "Black Sabbeth").
Sampled by Ice-T in the song "Midnight" from the 1991 album O.G. Original Gangster.

References

External links
AllMusic review of the song

1969 songs
1970 singles
Black Sabbath songs
Popular songs based on classical music
Songs about nightmares
Songs written by Ozzy Osbourne
Songs written by Tony Iommi
Songs written by Geezer Butler
Songs written by Bill Ward (musician)